Gjersjøelva (former Hvitebjørnselva) is a river in the municipality of Oppegård in Akershus county, Norway. The last part of the river forms the border between Akershus and Oslo. Gjersjøelva had one of the first saw mills in Norway, from the 16th century.

References

Rivers of Viken
Oppegård
Rivers of Norway